Kiril Mihaylov (born 13 February 1986 in Sofia) is a Bulgarian footballer who currently plays for Oborishte as a forward.

Career
Mihaylov was educated in Levski Sofia's youth academy, but made his professional debut with Naftex Burgas during the 2004–05 season. On 7 August 2004 he played his first match in the A PFG against Pirin Blagoevgrad. During the next three seasons Mihaylov played in the second division with Pomorie, Minyor Bobov dol and Rilski Sportist Samokov. 

On 29 January 2009, Maltese Birkirkara F.C. announced Mihaylov will join the club. Five months later Kiril leave the Maltese club and signed with Minyor Pernik. Mihaylov mutually terminated his contract with Minyor Pernik at the end of 2009 and was rumoured to be joining Kazakhstani side Irtysh Pavlodar as a free agent.

References

1986 births
Living people
Bulgarian footballers
Neftochimic Burgas players
Olympiakos Nicosia players
PFC Minyor Pernik players
FC Botev Vratsa players
Expatriate footballers in Cyprus
First Professional Football League (Bulgaria) players
Cypriot Second Division players

Association football forwards